The Guangzhou Marathon is an annual marathon race held in December in the city of Guangzhou, China, since 2012.  The marathon is categorized as a Gold Label Road Race by World Athletics.

History 

The event was first held on 18 November 2012. Two people died during the event: a 21 year old male student died after completing the 10 km race and a 25 year old real estate agent collapsed before completing the 5 km race.

In 2015, Sentayehu Merga Ejigu crossed the finish line first with a course record time of 2:09:57, but was later disqualified for failing an in-competition drug test.  This led to the promotion of the second runner to cross the finish line, Abdellah Tagharrafet, to first place.  He too had broken the course record, with a time of 2:10:01, but he too was later disqualified for doping.  As a result, the third runner to cross the finish line, Ethiopian Raji Assefa, was then promoted to first place.

In 2019, both winners won the event with a new course record: Gebretsadik Abraha Adihana won the men's race with a time of 2:08:04 and Hiwot Gebrekidan won the women's race with a time of 2:23:50.

In 2020, during the coronavirus pandemic, only runners who resided in areas of mainland China, Hong Kong, Macau, or Taiwan that were deemed to be at low risk for the virus were allowed to participate.  In addition, the marathon was the only distance offered that year. A year later, the 2021 Guangzhou Marathon was postponed due to the coronavirus pandemic.

Course 

Beginning at Tianhe Stadium, the marathon initially heads south to the Pearl River.  The course then largely runs along both sides of the river, with the rest of the first half mostly either on or east of the Liede Bridge, and most of the rest of the second half west of the bridge.  The last few kilometres are run on Ersha Island and Haixinsha Island before entering Huacheng Square for the finish.

Winners 

Key: Course record (in bold)

By country

Notes

References

External links 
 Official website

Marathons in China
Sports competitions in Guangzhou
Autumn events in China